The list of ship commissionings in 1948 includes a chronological list of all ships commissioned in 1948.


1948
 Ship commissionings